George Compton may refer to:

George Compton (Canadian politician) (1872–1950), politician in Manitoba, Canada
George Compton, 4th Earl of Northampton (1664–1727), British peer
George Compton, 6th Earl of Northampton (1692–1758), British peer and Member of Parliament